Military exemptions was the soldier's legal immunity in Polish–Lithuanian Commonwealth of 16th-17th century. 

Military exemptions allow to evaluate the legal position of mercenary soldiers, functioning of legal norms of a temporary character and the interrelations between the statutory law and customary law in Poland. 

In 16th and 17th centuries both the general exemptions, granted by Sejm (parliament), and hetman’s exemptions, deprived of the Sejm’s sanction, existed. The constitutions on the exemptions always had a temporary nature. As a consequence of the advancing paralysis of the parliament’s works, the exemptions issued by hetman became more and more common.

Exemptions were the releases to be applied before all types of courts, apart from military courts. They withheld the proceedings (even enforcement proceedings when the verdict did not benefit from the res iudicata character) with regard to all persons taking part in the military expeditions and their families. This enhanced the attractiveness of military service and prevented soldiers from leaving the army.

Exemptions were known to the customary law, however, they were formulated by Sejm by means of constitutions. The parliament, depending on the circumstances, enlarged or limited the group of the beneficiaries, applied more or less strict criteria, changed the time limits of the exemptions’ validity, prevented their abuse, and most importantly, it firmly opposed a rejection of the releases by courts.

References
Karol Łopatecki, Egzempcje wojskowe - immuniter żołnierski w Rzeczypospolitej szlacheckiej XVI-XVII wieku, "Zeszyty Prawnicze UKSW" 5.1 (2005)
Przemysław Gawron, Żołnierz i Trybunały w siedemnastowiecznej koronie. Na marginesie artykułu Karola  Łopateckiego Egzempcje wojskowe..., "Zeszyty Prawnicze UKSW" 7.1 (2007)

Further reading
Jan Seredyka, Księżniczka i chudopachołek. Zofia z Radziwiłłów Dorohostajska – Stanisław Tymiński, Opole 1993;
Jerzy Urwanowicz, Wojskowe „sejmiki”. Koła w wojsku Rzeczypospolitej XVI – XVIII wieku, Białystok 1996.

See also
 szlachta

Legal history of Poland
Military history of the Polish–Lithuanian Commonwealth